A Sinister Alphabet is the only studio album of Phantom 309, released in 1989 by Tupelo Recording Company.

Reception 
Ira Robbins of Trouser Press wrote an enthusiastic review, saying it "simmers with backwoods weirdness and domineering intensity" and calling it "a dish of gutter-level grungeabilly and cohesively crude rock noise distinguished by guitarist John Forbes' devilish growl."

Track listing

Personnel
Adapted from the A Sinister Alphabet liner notes.

Phantom 309
 John Forbes – vocals, electric guitar
 Gary Held – drums
 Mac McNeilly – bass guitar

Production and design
 Ian Caple – mixing
 Dean Clyne – assistant engineer
 Jon Langford – production, mixing
 Edward Gorey – cover art, illustrations
 Dan Vaganek – engineering

Release history

References

External links 
 

1989 debut albums
Phantom 309 (band) albums